Wolf Gunther Plaut,  (November 1, 1912 – February 8, 2012) was an American Reform rabbi and writer who was based in Canada. Plaut was the rabbi of Holy Blossom Temple in Toronto for several decades and since 1978 was its senior scholar.

Life and work
He was born in Münster, Germany. His father's name was Jonas and his mother's name was Selma. Gunther had a younger brother, Walter, who was the Rabbi of Temple Emanuel of Great Neck, NY at the time of his death in 1964 at the age of 44. Gunther received his Doctor of Laws degree and in 1935 fled the Nazis and went to the United States. In 1939, he received his ordination as a Rabbi from Hebrew Union College. After receiving his U.S. citizenship on March 31, 1943, he enlisted as a chaplain in the U.S. Army. He was eventually assigned to the 104th Infantry "Timberwolf" Division and served as a frontline chaplain with the 104th in Belgium and Germany. He held pulpits in Chicago, Illinois 1939-49) and at Mount Zion Temple in St. Paul, Minnesota (1948–1961). He moved to Holy Blossom Temple in 1961, replacing Abraham Feinberg.

He published a volume of commentary on the Torah and Haftarah, which has become the standard Humash used by the Reform movement. He was a long-time columnist for the Canadian Jewish News as well as a contributor of opinion pieces to various Canadian newspapers such as The Globe and Mail and the Toronto Star. He was the first recipient of the W. Gunther Plaut Humanitarian Award. In 1978, he was the honoree of the Toronto Jewish National Fund Negev Dinner.

He was president of the Canadian Jewish Congress from 1977 to 1980, and was also vice-chair of the Ontario Human Rights Commission. In 1983, he was elected president of the Central Conference of American Rabbis, the international association for Reform rabbis.

In 1978 he was made an Officer of the Order of Canada and was promoted to Companion in 1999. In 1993, he was awarded the Order of Ontario. In 1999, he received the Commander's Cross (Komturkreuz) of the Order of Merit of the Federal Republic of Germany.

A number of years ago, Plaut was diagnosed with Alzheimer's disease, and withdrew from all public activities. In February 2012, he died at Baycrest Hospital in Toronto, Ontario, Canada at the age of 99.

His son, Jonathan V. Plaut, was also a Reform rabbi, who served as rabbi of Temple Beth Israel in Jackson, Michigan.
His nephew, Rabbi Joshua Eli Plaut, Ph.D (son of Rabbi Walter H. and Hadassah Y. Plaut) is the director of the New York City based American Friends of Rabin Medical Center.

Selected works
 Die materielle Eheungültigkeit (doctoral dissertation, 1934)
 High Holiday Services for Children (1952)
 Mount Zion – The First Hundred Years (1956)
 The Jews in Minnesota; the first seventy-five years (1959)  59-14710
 The Book of Proverbs – A Commentary (1961) 61-9760
 Judaism and the Scientific Spirit (1962)  61-17139
 The Rise of Reform Judaism: A Sourcebook of Its European Origins (1963) 63-13568
 The Case for the Chosen People – The Role of the Jewish People Yesterday and Today (1965)  65-19869
 The Growth of Reform Judaism (1965) 65-18555
 Your Neighbour is a Jew (1967)
 The Sabbath as Protest: Thoughts on Work and Leisure in the Automated Society (1970)
 Page Two – Ten Years of "News and Views." (1971)
 A Shabbat Manual (1972) 72-10299
 Genesis. The Torah, A Modern Commentary, Vol. I (1974)
 Exodus. The Torah, A Modern Commentary, Vol. II
 Time to Think (1977)
 Hanging Threads: Stories Real and Surreal (1978) . Published in U.S. as The Man in the Blue Vest and Other Stories (1978) 
 Numbers. The Torah, A Modern Commentary, Vol. IV (1979) 
 Unfinished business: an Autobiography (1981), 
 The Torah: A Modern Commentary (1981), 
 Deuteronomy. The Torah, A Modern Commentary, Vol. V (1983)
 Refugee Determination in Canada (1985)
 The Letter (1986) 
 A Modern Commentary – Genesis. (1988) (In Hebrew)
 The Man Who Would Be Messiah: A Biographical Novel (1990), 
 The Magen David – How the Six-Pointed Star Became an Emblem for The Jewish People (1991) 
 German-Jewish Bible Translations: linguistic theology as a political phenonomen (1992)
 The Torah: a Modern Commentary 
 Asylum: A Moral Dilemma (1995), 
 The Haftarah Commentary (1996) 
 More Unfinished Business (1997), 
 Teshuvot for the Nineties: Reform Judaism’s Answers to Today’s Dilemmas (1997) 
 The Price and Privilege of Growing Old (2000) 
 The Reform Judaism Reader (2001) 
 Die Torah in Jüdischer Auslegung (in German) (1999–2004)
 The Torah: A Modern Commentary, Revised Edition 
 One Voice: The Selected Sermons of W. Gunther Plaut (2007) 
 Eight Decades: The Selected Writings of W. Gunther Plaut (2008)

References

External links
All of Rabbi Plaut's papers are housed at Library and Archives Canada in Ottawa, Ontario, Canada. Rabbi Plaut's entire library was donated to York University and is housed at York's Clara Thomas Archives & Special Collections.
 Gunther Plaut  at The Canadian Encyclopedia
 Scholar urged Jews to engage larger world Globe and Mail obituary 14 Feb. 2012

1912 births
2012 deaths
American biblical scholars
American expatriates in Canada
American Jewish Congress
American Reform rabbis
Commanders Crosses of the Order of Merit of the Federal Republic of Germany
Companions of the Order of Canada
Hebrew Union College – Jewish Institute of Religion alumni
Jewish emigrants from Nazi Germany to the United States
Members of the Order of Ontario
Rabbis in the military
United States Army chaplains
20th-century American rabbis
21st-century American rabbis